Mounir El Allouchi  (born 27 September 1994) is a Dutch footballer who plays as an attacking midfielder for Karmiotissa.

Club career
He formerly played for Helmond Sport.

Personal life
Born in the Netherlands, El Allouchi is of Moroccan descent.

References

External links
 
 
 Voetbal International profile

1994 births
Living people
Sportspeople from Roosendaal
Dutch footballers
Dutch sportspeople of Moroccan descent
Association football midfielders
NAC Breda players
Helmond Sport players
AS FAR (football) players
Eredivisie players
Eerste Divisie players
Botola players
Dutch expatriate footballers
Expatriate footballers in Morocco
Dutch expatriate sportspeople in Morocco
Footballers from North Brabant
21st-century Dutch people